The women's shot put event  at the 2002 European Athletics Indoor Championships was held on March 2.

Results

References
Results

Shot put at the European Athletics Indoor Championships
Shot
2002 in women's athletics